Fakhreddine Mosque with its octagonal minaret is a mosque in Deir al-Qamar, Lebanon. Built in 1493 by Fakhr al-Din I and restored in the sixteenth century, it is the oldest mosque in Mount Lebanon.

See also
Fakhreddine Palace

References

External links 

 Deir el Qamar Website

1493 establishments in Asia
Chouf District
Mosques in Lebanon
15th-century mosques
1490s in the Middle East